Anna Mlasowsky (born 1984) is a German artist. She is known for her experimental and boundary pushing work in glass and is recognized as one of the leading female artist working in glass today.

Her work has been shown at the Museum of Art and Design New York, the European Museum for Contemporary Glass, the Museum of Northwest Art, the Bellevue Arts Museum, the Glass Factory Museum in Boda, Sweden, the Tacoma Museum of Glass, USA and the Stockholm Architecture Museum in Sweden. 

Her work has been featured in American Craft, the Shanghai Museum of Glass Magazine, PBS Discovery Channel Canada, and Half Cut Tea. 

Her work is held in the permanent collections of the Corning Museum of Glass (USA) the Toyama Glass Art Museum (Japan), the Castello Sforzesco in Milan (Italy), the Museum of American Glass (USA) the Glasmuseum Ebeltoft(Denmark) the European Museum of Modern Glass (Germany) and the Seto City Art Museum (Japan) .

Biography 
Mlasowsky grew up in East Germany and first encountered glass makers in 2005, while traveling in northern Norway during her European Volunteer Service there. She saw glass makers working in a small village on the Lofoten Islands and the following year she enrolled to study glass at Engelsholm Højskole in Denmark. She completed a Bachelor of Arts degree at the Royal Danish Academy of Fine Arts in Glass, in 2011.She has worked as an independent artist, educator and curator since.

In 2016 she completed a Master of Fine Arts in sculpture from the University of Washington. She currently lives and works in Seattle, WA, USA. 

Anna received an Artist Trust Fellowship in 2017, was one of the Emerging Voices in Craft Shortlist Award recipients and was awarded an Emerging Artist residency at Centrum Foundation.    In 2018 she received the Aldo Bellini Award, the John and Joyce Price Award of Excellence and was a Museum of Art and Design Burk Prize finalist. 

In 2021–2022, Mlasowsky is a Haas Short Term Fellow and Artist in residence at the Science History Institute, studying the history of rare earths. used in Glass today, the socio-ecologic impact of their extraction, and the way they enable a globalized society.

Awards 
2021           Silver Prize, Toyama International Glass Prize, Japan

2019           Chihuly Emerging Artist Award, Seattle, USA

                   Windgate Award, Suny Purchase College of Art, New York, USA 

2018           Aldo Bellini Prize, Castello Sforzesco, Milano, Italy

                   Finalist: Burke Prize, Museum of Art and Design, NY

                  „BAM“, Biennial John and Joyce Price- Award of Excellence, Bellevue Arts Museum, USA 

2017           Jurors Choice Award, Annual International Irvin Borowksy Prize in Glass, USA

                   Finalist: Emerging Voices in Craft Awards, American Craft Council, USA 

2015           Punch Gallery Award, Members Choice Award, USA

2014           Page Hazelgrove Annual Award, Massachusetts Institute of Technology, USA

                   TAG Grant, Award for Advancement of Technology in Contemporary Glass, USA

                   Silver Award Winner: Emerge Competition, Bullseye, USA 

                   Otto Waldrich Prize, Coburg Glass Prize, Germany

2013           UK Glass Prize, 1. Preis, England

2011           Glasmuseum Ebeltoft, Projekt Award, Denmark

                   Finalist: Stanislav Libenski Award, Tschechien

                   Finalist: European Advancement Award for young Glass, Stadtmuseum Zwiesel, Germany 

2010           Kaleidos Award, Upsala, Schweden

Grants 
2021           Haas Short Term Research Fellowship, Science History Institute, Philadelphia, USA

Artworks Archive, Accelerator Grant, USA

                   Awesome Foundation Grant, for “Das Schaufenster“, USA

2020           COVID-19 Relief Grants:  The Artist Fellowship, Seattle Artist Relief Fund, Foundation for Contemporary Art, 4Culture Artist Relief, Artist Relief Project

                   SmArt Venture Grant, Office Of Arts and Culture, Seattle, USA

2019           4Culture, Project Grant, Seattle, USA

                   Scholarship Pilchuck Glass School, Seattle, USA

2017           Artist Trust Fellowship, USA

2016           Artist Grant, Vermont Studio Center Residency, USA 

2015           Scholarship, Glass Art Society, USA

Scholarship, Puget Sound Group of Northwest Artists, USA

2013           IASPIS Grant, Swedish Ministry for Arts and Culture, Sweden

2012           Scholarship, Pilchuck Glass school, USA

                   Artist Grant, Alexander Tutsek Stiftung, Germany

2011           Penland school of Craft: Isaac & Sonia Luski Scholarship, USA

2010           Danske Nationalbankens Jubilaeumsfond af 1968, Denmark

2009           Augustinus Fonden, Denmark

                   Student scholarship University of Art and Design, Helsinki, Finland

2008           Scholarship Pilchuck Glass School, USA

                   Scholarship, The Corning Museum of Glass scholarship, USA

                   Artist Grant, Ingenör Vald. Selmer Trane og hustru Elisa Tranes Fond, Denmark

                   Artist Grant,  Krista & Viggo Petersens Fond, Denmark

Residencies 
2022           Tacoma Museum of Glass, Glass Studio Residency Program

2021           Haas Short-Term Fellow and Artist-in-Residence at the Science History Institute, USA

                   Visiting Artist residency Tyler School of Art, Glass Department, USA

                   Innovators in Glass Residency, Pilchuck Glass School, USA    

2020           Artist in Residence, Urban Glass, NY University and Pratt Institut New York, USA

2019           Windgate Artist in Residency, Suny Purchase College of Art, New York, USA

2018           Sculpture Space Residency, USA

                   Visiting Artist, University of Hawaii Manoa, Oahu, USA

2017           Emerging Artist Residency Centrum Foundation, Port Townsend, USA

                   Vermont Studio Center Residency, Johnston, USA

2016           Corning Incorporated Specialty Glass Residency, Corning, USA

2014           Bullseye Resource Center Bay Area Artist in Residence, Emeryville, USA

2013           Artist in Residence, Pittsburgh Glass Center, PA, USA

                  Artist in Residence, The Glass Factory Museum, Boda, Sweden

The Corning Museum of Glass Studio Residency, Corning, USA

AA2A residency Program, National Glasscenter, University of Sunderland, UK

2012           International Ceramic and Glass Art Exchange Program, Seto, Japan 

2011           Wheaton Arts and Cultural Center, CGCA residency Fellowship, NJ, USA

                  Toyama City Institute of Glass Art residency, Toyama, Japan

Selected public lectures and performances 
2021           Lecture:  “Anders-artig-keit”, Konstfack University of Arts & Design, Sweden

                   Lecture: “Enabeling Transparency” für das Symposium “Craft Ways-Tending through Craft” Center for Craft and the Warren Wilson College, USA 

2019           Host of the Paneldiscussion: Suny Purchase College of Art, NY, USA, on issues faced by female immigrant artists in the US (invited speakers: Sera Boeno, Roxana Fabius, Katya Grokhovsky, Yulia Topchiy)

2018           Lecture: “Behind the Glass“, Corning Museum of Glass, NY, USA

                   Live-Performance: Bellevue Arts Museum, USA, “Chorus of One”, collaboration with Alethea Alexander and Alexandra Bradshaw-Yerby (University of Washington Dance Department)

                   Lecture: American Craft Council Salon Series, Minnesota, USA

2017           Lecture: “Technology Advancing Glass”, Glass Art Society, Norfolk, USA

2016           Paneldiscussion: “Technology in Art” Panel, Atoms and Bytes Exhibition, Bellevue Art Museum, USA

                   Live-Performance: “Straight Line Thinking”, University of Washington, USA

2015           Paneldiscussion: „kilnforming and new developments“ Bullseye Projects, Portland USA

                   Live-Performance: of △▽ with Ellen Jing Xu, Velocity Dance Center, Seattle, USA 

                   Live-Performance: “Lineage”, Per4m4rum, University of Washington, USA

2014           Lecture: „Page Hazelgrove Lecture“, Massachusetts Institute of Technology, Boston, USA

2012           Lecture: „Emerging Artist Lecture“, Glass Art Society, Toledo, USA

2012           Lecture: Program-Seto City Art Museum, Seto, Japan

References

University of Washington alumni
Living people
1984 births
German glass artists
21st-century German artists